Van Beijeren is a surname. Notable people with the surname include:

 Abraham van Beijeren ( 1620–1690), Dutch painter
 Geert van Beijeren (1933–2005), Dutch art dealer
 Leendert van Beijeren (1619–1649), Dutch painter